Xanthosine monophosphate also called Xanthylate is an intermediate in purine metabolism. It is a ribonucleoside monophosphate. It is formed from IMP via the action of IMP dehydrogenase, and it forms GMP via the action of GMP synthase. Also, XMP can be released from XTP by enzyme deoxyribonucleoside triphosphate pyrophosphohydrolase containing (d)XTPase activity.

It is abbreviated XMP.

See also
 Xanthosine

References

Further reading

Nucleotides
Xanthines